The Sulawesi pygmy woodpecker (Yungipicus temminckii), also known as the Sulawesi woodpecker, is a species of bird in the family Picidae. It is endemic to Sulawesi in Indonesia.  Its natural habitats are subtropical or tropical moist lowland forest and subtropical or tropical moist mountains. Some taxonomic authorities continue to place this species in the genus Dendrocopos or Picoides.

References

Sulawesi pygmy woodpecker
Endemic birds of Sulawesi
Sulawesi pygmy woodpecker
Sulawesi pygmy woodpecker
Taxonomy articles created by Polbot
Taxobox binomials not recognized by IUCN